Simon Monroe may refer to:

Simon Monroe, namesake of Monroe, Oklahoma
Simon Monroe, character in In the Flesh (TV series)